is a Japanese fantasy light novel series written by Miri Mikawa and illustrated by aki. Kadokawa Shoten have published seventeen volumes from March 2010 to February 2015 under their Kadokawa Beans Bunko imprint. A manga adaptation with art by Alto Yukimura was serialized online via Hakusensha's Hana to Yume Online website from November 2012 to October 2014. It was collected in two tankōbon volumes. A second manga adaptation with art by Yozora no Udon has been serialized in Kadokawa Shoten's seinen manga magazine Young Ace since November 2021. Both the light novel and second manga are licensed in North America by Yen Press. An anime television series adaptation produced by J.C.Staff premiered in January 2023.

Plot
Anne Halford is a candy crafter determined to follow in her mother's footsteps and become a Silver Sugar Master, a title bestowed only by royalty. In order to travel to the capital and realize her dream, she purchases Shall, a handsome but foul-mouthed fairy, as her bodyguard. Anne wishes to befriend her new companion, but in this kingdom where fairies are treated as property upon possession of one of their wings, Shall wants nothing to do with humans.

Characters

Ann is the main protagonist and a Silver Sugar artisan, who is determined to follow in the footsteps of her recently deceased mother and become a Silver Sugar master. Ann leaves home to travel to the Royal Candy Fair to participate in its contest to win the Sugar Master title and purchases Shall, a warrior fairy to protect her in their travels, but promises to return his wing. Ann does not like the idea of fairies being forced into slavery and believes it's possible for fairies and humans to become friends. Ann is a hard working and gifted Sugar artisan, but continues to improve her skills as she meets more sugar confectioners and masters along her journey. Ann begins to fall in love with Shall as the story continues.

Shall is a warrior fairy who was purchased by Ann to serve as her bodyguard. Although very handsome and beautiful, Shall has a sharp tongue and constantly teases Ann, frequently calling her scarecrow. In the past, he was close friends with a young girl called Elizabeth, until she was killed by humans. Due to his years of enslavement and Liz's death, he distrusts humans, but gradually begins to grow close to Ann and decides to stay with her after she returns his wing. Over the course of the story, Shall becomes very protective of Ann and finds himself falling in love with her.

Mythril is a water fairy who was saved by Ann from a ruthless fairy hunter. Although he dislikes humans, he is determined to repay the favor to Ann and becomes a friend and traveling companion on her journey. He ties his wing around his neck in the style of a scarf and prefers to called by his full name. He is also aware of Ann's love for Shall and fully supports their relationship.

Hugh is the Silver Sugar Viscount who befriends Ann on her journey. He is impressed by Ann's skills and pushes her to be better in order to help inspire her own original work.

Cat is a Silver Sugar master who resides in the town of Lewiston. When his sugar confection order is destroyed in a robbery attempt, he falsely assumes Ann is responsible and has her work for him temporarily. Despite his harsh and tough  demeanour, he respects Ann's hard work and skills and is willing to admit to his own mistakes, apologizing when she proves her innocence. He does not like people of high society or tolerate those who treat others unfairly, refusing to sell to customers he dislikes or petty artisans who harass Ann. Cat’s real name is Alph Hingley and he dislikes his nickname. He is also acquainted with Hugh Mercury and Keith Powell. 

Jonas is Ann's former friend turned rival and nephew of the Radcliffe Workshop headmaster Marcus Radcliffe. He attends the Radcliffe Workshop as a sugar artisan, but lacks skill and ingenuity. Originally, he appears kind and helpful who is determined to marry Ann, until he later drops his facade and reveals his true colours as a selfish manipulator after accomplishing his real plan: To steal Ann's sugar confection and present it as his own work at the Royal Candy fair. However, his plan fails after he is exposed as a cheater, proven when he is unable to replicate the piece. Jonas and Ann continue to hold a rivalry and dislike of each other. Despite his arrogance, Jonas is later revealed to be a victim of bullying by his uncle’s apprentice, Sammy Jones and tries to stay out of trouble whilst preparing for the next Royal Candy Fair.

Keith is the son of the previous Silver Sugar Viscount. Since childhood, Keith has spent most of his life surrounded by sugar confections and has met many artisans, including Cat and Ann's late mother. He is well respected among his peers and aspires to become a silver sugar master himself, but due to his father's position, never entered the Royal Fair to prevent rumours of favouritism or unfairness. Following the death of his father, Keith decides to participate in the competition and currently attends the Radcliffe Workshop. He is a sincere young man who offers to help Ann due to their similar upbringings and circumstances and sees her as a worthy rival unlike Jonas and Sammy.

Elliot is a sugar artisan who attends the Page Workshop. He is flirtatious and easy-going and is engaged to Bridget Page.

Bridget is the daughter of the head of the Page Workshop. She is engaged to marry Elliot Collins, but has no romantic interest in him since it's an arranged marriage. She instantly falls in love Shall after meeting him and is determined to have him for herself.

Cathy is a labor fairy belonging to Jonas and is secretly in love with him.

Benjamin is a labor fairy and belongs to Cat. He is easily tired and very sleeping, but always happily obeys Cat's orders and gets the job done. He is revealed to have possession of his wing, but willingly chooses to stay with Cat.

William is the Duke of Philax. He fell in love with the water fairy Christina, but her death caused him to neglect his duties as the duke that leads to his subjugation by the Earl of Downing.

Sammy is a sugar artisan and a longtime apprentice at the Radcliffe Workshop. He is rude, arrogant, selfish, sexist, and disrespectful towards those he considers inferior, but respects those of higher rank such as Cat and Keith. He harbours a strong dislike and animosity towards Ann, refusing to acknowledge her as a sugar artisan and is upset when she allowed into the workshop in preparation for the Royal Candy Fair. Sammy is held in high regard at the Radcliffe school, favoured to win the exhibition and uses his influence to bully Ann. With the aid of the other students, Sammy attacks Ann, threatening to burn her hands until Shall saves her. Despite his actions, Sammy avoids punishment by reporting the incident, but hides his involvement, resulting in the headmaster ousting both Ann and Jonas from the workshop.

Media

Light novels
The light novel is licensed in North America by Yen Press.

Manga
A manga adaptation with art by Alto Yukimura was serialized online via Hakusensha's Hana to Yume Online website from November 2012 to October 2014. It was collected in two tankōbon volumes. A second manga adaptation with art by Yozora no Udon has been serialized in Kadokawa Shoten's seinen manga magazine Young Ace since November 4, 2021. The second manga is also licensed in North America by Yen Press, who are publishing new chapters simultaneously with the Japanese release.

2012 manga

2021 manga

Anime
On October 1, 2021, an anime adaptation was announced. It was later revealed to be a television series produced by J.C.Staff and directed by Yōhei Suzuki, with scripts written by Seishi Minakami, character designs handled by Haruko Iizuka, and music composed by Hinako Tsubakiyama. It premiered on January 6, 2023, on AT-X and other networks. On August 6, 2022, during their industry panel at Crunchyroll Expo, Crunchyroll announced their license to the series outside of Asia.

References

External links
 
 

2010 Japanese novels
2023 anime television series debuts
Anime and manga based on light novels
AT-X (TV network) original programming
Crunchyroll anime
Fantasy anime and manga
Hakusensha manga
Japanese webcomics
J.C.Staff
Kadokawa Beans Bunko
Kadokawa Dwango franchises
Kadokawa Shoten manga
Light novels
Seinen manga
Shōjo manga
Webcomics in print
Yen Press titles